Portmore is a hamlet in the New Forest National Park of Hampshire, England. It is in the civil parish of Boldre.   Its nearest town is Lymington, which lies approximately 1.3 miles (2.7 km) south-west from the village.

External links

Hamlets in Hampshire